Steffan "Mr. Wiggles" Clemente is a street dancer, noted for his popping skills. He is a member of the Rock Steady Crew, The Electric Boogaloos, Tribal Click, Zulu Nation, and TC5, also known as The Cool Five or The Crazy Five. Wiggles has been active as a dancer, actor, choreographer, dance instructor, music producer and graffiti artist.

Biography
Steffan "Mr. Wiggles" Clemente, born in 1965 in Bronx N.Y., is a South Bronx Puerto Rican raised on hip hop since the early 70's. His dancing career started by battling all around New York City. He built his battling reputation until he was able to battle around the world. This includes Europe, South America, Asia, the Middle East, Canada, and on the stages of Broadway. Mr. Wiggles has also been credited for 2 important movies which helped establish hip hop today. These movies are "Beat Street" and "Wild Style".

During his time in the graffiti crew, TC5, Clemente was known as "Rek" by other members of the group. Clemente originally got his stage name of Mr. Wiggles from a leader in the TC5 crew, who went by both "Seen" and "Mr. Wiggles." While cutting class, Clemente had shown Seen a certain dance move which inspired him to give Clemente his side-alias, Mr. Wiggles.

Aside from dancing, Mr. Wiggles also worked in theater, film, and music with popular artists such as Graciela Daniele, Bill Irwin, and Ann Marie DeAngelo. He has been a featured artist in the Apollo Theater and performed at the Kennedy Center. He has appeared in music videos with artists such as Missy Elliot, Usher, Madonna, and Limp Bizkit, among others.

Steffan Clemente is married to Zoraya Clemente and has 6 children named Unico, Alexandra, Talib, Ammar, Atiya, and Zamaria.

Wiggles performs as a solo artist and with the Electric Boogaloos and Rock Steady Crew. He is also committed to participating in outreach programs teaching youth about the positive aspects of hip hop culture.

Awards
Wiggles received a 1993 Foundation for Contemporary Arts Grants to Artists Award. Wiggles was nominated for a Drama Desk Award for the Ghettoriginal production of Jam on the Groove. He won a Bessie Award for Best Choreography for the theatrical production of So What Happens Now, a play dedicated to Buck4, a deceased Rock Steady Crew member.

Wiggles along with the members of Rock Steady Crew was acclaimed at the first VH-1 Hip Hop Honors in 2004.

In popular culture
Mr. Wiggles' instructional VHS tape Mr. Wiggles Sessions: : King Tut Style  was featured in an episode of Red Letter Media's Best of the Worst entitled Wheel of the Worst #17. 
The episode ends with Rich Evans parodying Clemente as "Mr. Jiggles" who demonstrates "King Gut Style."

See also
Rock Steady Crew
Popping
Breakdancing
Locking
Street dance

References

External links

The Electric Boogaloos official website
Rock Steady Crew official website

American breakdancers
Popping dancers
Living people
Entertainers from the Bronx
Year of birth missing (living people)